Adam Neder (1865 – September 17, 1910) was a German-born soldier in the U.S. Army who served with the 7th U.S. Cavalry during the Indian Wars. He was one of five men received the Medal of Honor for distinguished bravery, participating in search-and-destroy missions along White Clay Creek, at the Battle of Wounded Knee on December 29, 1890.

Biography
Adam Neder was born in Bavaria, Germany in 1865. He later emigrated to the United States and enlisted in the U.S. Army from St. Louis, Missouri in June 1886. Assigned to frontier duty with the 7th U.S. Cavalry, Neder was a participant in the Battle of Wounded Knee on December 29, 1890. After fighting broke out between cavalrymen and the Sioux, Neder was among the troopers who, as part of a search-and-destroy mission, took part in skirmishes along White Clay Creek. He and four other men — Sergeant Bernhard Jetter, First Sergeant Theodore Ragner, Corporal William O. Wilson and Farrier Richard J. Nolan — received the Medal of Honor for distinguished bravery on April 25, 1891. Seriously wounded during the battle, Neder was also promoted to the rank of corporal for his actions. He was eventually promoted to sergeant, and served in the Spanish–American War until his discharge in 1899. He died in San Francisco, California on September 17, 1910, and was interred in the San Francisco National Cemetery.

Medal of Honor citation
Rank and organization: Private, Company A, 7th U.S. Cavalry. Place and date: Sioux campaign, December 1890. Entered service at:------. Birth: Bavaria. Date of issue: 25 April 1891.

Citation:

Distinguished bravery.

See also

 List of Medal of Honor recipients for the Indian Wars

References

External links
 

1865 births
1910 deaths
Bavarian emigrants to the United States
American military personnel of the Indian Wars
United States Army Medal of Honor recipients
United States Army soldiers
German-born Medal of Honor recipients
American Indian Wars recipients of the Medal of Honor
Burials at San Francisco National Cemetery
Pine Ridge Campaign
Military personnel from Bavaria